Bryan Russell (born March 22, 1981) is an American record producer. His credits include artists such as Straylight Run, Envy on the Coast, The Academy Is, and Anterrabae, and has also worked on records with Coldplay, Dream Theater, Paul Simon, Blue Wolf and Steely Dan.  Bryan started your career working on The Hit Factory after your graduation on Oberlin College from 2002 to 2005. In the same year, he started his studio Red Wire Audio.

He is currently living and working out of New York City and married to Suzie Zeldin, of the bands The Narrative & Twin Forks, on 27 April 2014.

Albums produced by Bryan Russell 
List of respective bands, albums and the role produced by Bryan Russell

References

External links
Bryan Russell's official website

1981 births
Place of birth missing (living people)
Living people
Record producers from Pennsylvania
Oberlin College people